Farmcare Trading Limited is the largest lowland farming organisation in the United Kingdom. Farmcare traded as The Co-operative Farms while a subsidiary of The Co-operative Group until it was sold to the Wellcome Trust in 2014.

History

The Co-operative Farms
The first farm was acquired at Roden, Shropshire in 1896 in order to supply potatoes to local societies' stores. By 1918, the then Co-operative Wholesale Society already farmed a total of 32,648 acres (13,212 ha) across England.

Following the merger of CWS and Co-operative Retail Services in 2001, CWS Agriculture became Farmcare Limited. It was rebranded as The Co-operative Farms in 2007.

Wellcome Trust
On 4 August 2014, the business was sold to the Wellcome Trust for £249 million, to reduce The Co-operative Group's debt following its financial crisis in 2013. At the time of the sale, The Co-operative Farms owned  of land organised as 15 farms, and more than 100 residential and 27 commercial properties.

See also
 Associated Co-operative Creameries

References

External links

The Co-operative Group
Farms in the United Kingdom